SM UB-91 was a German Type UB III submarine or U-boat in the German Imperial Navy during World War I. She was commissioned into the German Imperial Navy on 11 April 1918 as SM UB-91.

Surrender 

UB-91 was surrendered to Britain on 21 November 1918 at Harwich. She toured the South Wales ports of Cardiff, Newport, Swansea, Port Talbot and was towed to Pembroke Dock, eventually being broken up in Briton Ferry in 1921. King George V  presented her deck gun to the town of Chepstow by in recognition of the bravery of William Charles Williams RN VC at Gallipoli in 1915. The gun forms part of the Chepstow War Memorial.

Construction

She was built by AG Vulcan of Hamburg and following just under a year of construction, launched at Hamburg on 6 March 1918. UB-91 was commissioned later the same year . Like all Type UB III submarines, UB-91 carried 10 torpedoes and was armed with a  deck gun. UB-91 had a displacement of  while surfaced and  when submerged. Her engines enabled her to travel at  when surfaced and  when submerged.

Summary of raiding history

References

Notes

Citations

Bibliography 

 

German Type UB III submarines
World War I submarines of Germany
U-boats commissioned in 1918
1918 ships
Ships built in Hamburg